The Round Barn, Millville Township is an historical building located in rural Clayton County, Iowa, United States. It was built in 1916 as a general purpose barn. The building is a true round barn that measures  in diameter. It is covered in metal vertical siding and features a dome roof, a cupola with an aerator and a central silo. It is one of three round barns extant in Iowa known to have a dome roof. The barn has been listed on the National Register of Historic Places since 1986.

References

Infrastructure completed in 1916
Buildings and structures in Clayton County, Iowa
Barns on the National Register of Historic Places in Iowa
Round barns in Iowa
National Register of Historic Places in Clayton County, Iowa
1916 establishments in Iowa